Severka is a rural locality (a selo) and the administrative center of Seversky Selsoviet of Klyuchevsky District, Altai Krai, Russia. The population was 1,562 as of 2016. There are 16 streets.

Geography and Ecology 
Severka is located 16 km south of Klyuchi (the district's administrative centre) by road. Novovoznesenka is the nearest rural locality. Between Severka and the nearby border with Kazakhstan there is a Lake named Petokhovo (Ozero Petuhovskoe,), which is a hypersaline soda lake. Metagenomic analyses of lake samples collected in July 2016 indicate the presence of archaea belonging to the Lokiarchaeota group (MAG: Ca. Lokiarchaeota archaeon isolate CSSed165cm_327R1) among other other microbes.

References 

Rural localities in Klyuchevsky District